Stephen Bienko is an American coach and athlete. He is best known as the founding Director of the Institute of Athletic Performance, the former largest franchise owner of the College Hunks Hauling Junk brand, and holding the Villanova University discus throw record for eight years.

Early life
Bienko grew up in, Green Township, New Jersey and was a three-sport star during high school at the Delbarton School, where he graduated in 1994.

He attended the United States Air Force Academy and was a member of its football team. He graduated from Villanova University, Pennsylvania. where he competed as a decathlete and held the school record in the discus at 172' 11" (52.71m) from 1998 - 2005.

Bienko began his professional career in the New Jersey State Police. His positions have included: Director of Marketing at Kennedy Funding, Inc.; a State Trooper with the  NJ State Police working in the Alcoholic Beverage Control Special Task Force Unit; Senior Vice President at SequentialT; CEO of Fownders, Founding Director of the Institute of Athletic Performance (IAP), which became partners with Parisi's and Director of Communications at Doyle Management Group.

Personal life
Bienko lives in Allamuchy Township, New Jersey with his three children.

Bienko previously served on the Board of Directors for the PACE School for Girls and Junior Achievement of Southwest Florida.

References

1979 births
Living people
21st-century American businesspeople
American state police officers
Delbarton School alumni
People from Allamuchy Township, New Jersey
United States Air Force Academy alumni
Villanova University alumni
Military personnel from New Jersey